Rakta Charitra is a 2010 Indian political action thriller film based on the life of Paritala Ravindra. The film was directed by Ram Gopal Varma and written by Prashant Pandey. Shot simultaneously in Telugu and Hindi with the latter titled Rakht Charitra, the film stars Vivek Oberoi as Pratap Ravi, while Radhika Apte, Sudeep, Shatrughan Sinha, Abhimanyu Singh, Kota Srinivasa Rao and Sushant Singh play supporting roles. The film marks Oberoi's acting debut in Telugu cinema. A sequel to the film, Rakta Charitra 2 (2010), was released later that year.

The film met with huge critical acclaim from critics praising screenplay, story, direction, cinematography, dialogues & realistic approach. Oberoi’s portrayal of Paritala Ravi was deemed one of the best performances in his filmography by the critics and audiences.

Plot
Narasimha Reddy, a local politician, is a powerful man in the area. His close associate Veera Bhadra (Rajendra Gupta), is his trustworthy ally for his political work, to the extent that Narasimha Reddy gives him the freedom to contest Jilla Parishad polls with his men. Veera Bhadra champions the causes of the poor and oppressed, and they look up to him like their leader.
Nagamuni Reddy (Kota Srinivasa Rao), who is the local MLA of the district and close to Narasimha Reddy, becomes jealous of the budding trust between Veera Bhadra and Narasimha Reddy, and starts poisoning Narasimha Reddy against Veera Bhadra. Narasimha summons Veera Bhadra and asks him not to contest the polls with his contestants, but rather support Nagamuni Reddy's. Veera Bhadra lashes out at Narasimha Reddy for being unfair to the underprivileged communities and storms out. Nagamuni Reddy calls for Manda (Ashish Vidyarthi), a close follower of Veerabhadra, and manipulates him into killing Veerabhadra, giving him the assurance that if he does it, people will suspect the policies of Veera Bhadra as his own follower killed him and he will be the next in line as the leader of the poor people, else take his life. Manda reluctantly agrees to it. Veerabhadra and his wife (Zarina Wahab) travel in a bus with 40 people to a wedding. Manda and Nagamani's men stop the bus, kill Veerabhadra's guards, and tell him to step out of the bus or else he will be killed along with the other innocents on the bus. Veera Bhadra comes out, looking at Manda, and dares him to kill. Nagamani's henchman Durga shoots at Veerabhadra, making it look like Manda shot at him; prompting Manda about the deal he made with Nagamani, he tells him to kill him in front of everyone. Manda takes a boulder and crushes Veerabhadra's skull, and kills him.

This results in an agitation led by Shankar, who wants to avenge his father's murder by killing all the men of Nagamani and Narasimha Reddy. Enter Nagamuni's son Bukka Reddy (Abhimanyu Singh), described as a ruthless man who enjoys raping women and killing men in brutal ways. He starts killing Shankar's men in gory ways: drilling a hole into their skull, chopping off their heads with a sugarcane chopper, burning them alive and feeding them to ravenous rats.

Pratap Ravi (Vivek Oberoi), who is in college in the city of Anantapur, gets the news of his father's murder and rushes to the village. Nagamani Reddy orders the local police inspector to kill Shankar in a fake encounter. When Pratap Ravi goes to the police station to ask about his brother, the inspector shows him Shankar's dead body and mocks him. Infuriated with his brother's murder, Pratap Ravi and Veerabhadra's men kill all the police officers and the inspector.

Pratap Ravi hides in the jungle with his father's associates and vows to kill Narsimha Reddy, Nagamuni Reddy and Manda one by one, instilling fear of death in each one of them. He starts by busting into the house of Narasimha Reddy, killing his guards and finally killing him with a scythe in front of his wife as she looks on in horror. Next is Manda; as he roams in the market, Pratap's men follow him, and before he can defend himself, they chop his hand off. Manda begs for his life, but Pratap stabs him in front of everyone. They plan to kill Nagamuni Reddy, but they are cautious as there is heavy police security in his house. As Nagamani Reddy is sitting on his lawn conversing with a police officer, he is shot at by Pratap, who is dressed as the cop, and his men, dressed as cops as well, kill most of the policemen.

The story progresses as famed film star-turned-politician Shivaji Rao targets Anantapur for contesting elections. The day he enters Anantapur for the rally, Bukka Reddy's men throw bombs, which makes Shivaji Rao get back inside the car and go back. This insults him greatly, and he asks his secretary for the one who can stop Bukka Reddy. Immediately, his secretary mentions Pratap Ravi's name; Shivaji Rao sends for him and puts down a proposal of joining his party and ticket for contesting elections. On the other hand, Bukka Reddy makes his brother Puru Reddy contest for elections and tries to sabotage the voting process by stealing the ballots. Pratap starts his rampage by eliminating, one by one, every rival of his party. Eventually, he comes across a man named Babu Qadri, who seeks Pratap's help in avenging his sister's death. Bukka Reddy had raped his 16-year-old sister, because of which she immolated herself, and Bukka had then broken Babu Qadri's leg. Pratap assures him his vengeance but asks him to forget everything for some time.

As Bukka Reddy's men fail in rigging the election process, Pratap Ravi wins by a majority. Immediately, Bukka Reddy is arrested. Puru Reddy gets him out on bail through Sirji's influence. Bukka, inflamed with the desire to avenge his father's death, hides out in an apartment with his men, and plots to kill Pratap Ravi. Pratap learns about his hideout devises a plan to execute him. He immediately gathers his men and calls Babu Qadri, who had sought Pratap's help in avenging his sister, to lead the execution of Bukka Reddy. He calls for the servant of Bukka Reddy and bribes him with 500,000 to aid in the execution. Babu Qadri and Pratap's men rush into the apartment, killing all Bukka's men; then killing Bukka Reddy with an axe.

Cast

 Vivek Oberoi as Kattula Pratap Ravi
 Radhika Apte as Kattula Nandini
 Shatrughan Sinha as Konda Shivaji Rao
 Kota Srinivasa Rao as Rajidi Nagamani Reddy
 Zarina Wahab as Gajula Jayalakshmi
 Sudeep as DCP Dasari Mohan Prasad
 Sushmita Mukherjee as Bolla Gomati
 Anupam Shyam as Recharla Omkar
 Vishwajeet Pradhan as Rajidi Puru Reddy
 Tanikella Bharani as Padalaneni Ramamurti
 Subrat Dutta as AK
 Abhimanyu Singh as Rajidi Bukka Reddy
 Sushant Singh as Thota Shankar Ravi
 Ashish Vidyarthi as Mandha
 Rajendra Gupta as Gajula Veerabhadra
 Ashwini Kalsekar as Ashwini Sinha
 Kitty as Nalla Narasimha Reddy (voice dubbed by Shakti Singh)
 Darshan Jariwala as SP Kanoonga
 Pragathi as Harita
 Chetanya Adib as Tella Durga
 Salman Yusuff Khan (special appearance)

Critical reception

Vivek Oberoi's performance in the role of Paritala Ravi drew widespread praise, while Abhimanyu Singh's devious turn as Bukka Reddy, modelled on the real-life Obul Reddy, was regarded as one of the most terrifying villainous acts captured on celluloid in a long time. Renuka Rao of DNA India gave the movie 4 stars in a scale of 5, concluding that  RGV has surprisingly thrown at the audience a film that could actually evoke some emotions in you. A must, must watch." Taran Adarsh of Bollywood Hungama gave the movie 4 stars in a scale of 5, saying that "On the whole, RAKHT CHARITRA is not for the faint-hearted or the lily-livered. The violence, the blood and gore depicted in the film will shock and disconcert you, which only goes to establish as to how proficiently the subject material has been treated." Nikhat Kazmi of Times of India gave the movie 3 stars out of 5, stating that "Rakta Charitra holds up a brutal mirror on the muck that masquerades as democracy in India." Rajeev Masand of CNN-IBN gave the movie 3 out of 5 stars, noting that "Rakta Charitra is a bold, disturbing film that’s bursting with the kind of confidence we haven’t seen from the filmmaker recently. If the sight of blood doesn’t make you uncomfortable, chances are you’ll enjoy this film." Kittu Singh of Rediff gave the movie 2.5 out of 5, writing that "Once the film is over you realise that all Rakta Charitra has been is a two-hour promotional fare for Rakta Charitra 2. Yes, there is more to come." Anupama Chopra of NDTV gave the movie 2.5 stars in a scale of 5 stars. Shubhra Gupta of Indian Express gave the movie 2.5 stars out of 5, and wrote that "It is an interesting story, and Oberoi, re-united with RGV after Company does a good job as Ravi. But the blood overtakes it all: Rakta Charitra is not for the faint-hearted."

Accolades
2011 Screen Awards
Nominated
Best Actor – Vivek Oberoi
Best Supporting Actress – Zarina Wahab
Best Female Debut – Radhika Apte
Best Action – Javed-Eijaz

2011 Stardust Awards
Nominated
Best Film of the Year – Action / Thriller – Rakht Charitra
Best Director – Thriller/ Action – Ram Gopal Varma
Best Actor in an Ensemble Cast – Abhimanyu Singh
Best Actress in an Ensemble Cast – Zarina Wahab

2011 Zee Cine Awards
Nominated
Best Actor in a Negative Role – Abhimanyu Singh

Soundtrack

Sequel

A sequel titled Rakta Charitra 2 was released in December 2010 and included Tamil actor Suriya as part of the main cast.

References

External links

Indian multilingual films
2010 action thriller films
2010 crime drama films
2010 crime thriller films
2010 films
2010 multilingual films
2010s Hindi-language films
2010s political thriller films
2010s Telugu-language films
Biographical action films
Indian biographical films
Indian films about revenge
Indian films based on actual events
Films about organised crime in India
Films directed by Ram Gopal Varma
Films set in Andhra Pradesh
Films set in the 1990s
Films scored by Sukhwinder Singh
Films shot in Andhra Pradesh
Indian action thriller films
Indian crime thriller films
Indian crime drama films
Indian political thriller films
Political action films
Indian avant-garde and experimental films